Luangwa National Park can refer to either of two parks in Zambia: 

North Luangwa National Park
South Luangwa National Park